The 1998 German Athletics Championships were held at the Friedrich-Ludwig-Jahn-Sportpark in Berlin on 3–5 July 1998.

Results

Men

Women

References 
 Results source: 

1998
German Athletics Championships
German Athletics Championships